HAL School Korwa, is an independent, co-educational day school in Korwa, Amethi, Uttar Pradesh, India. The school is an English medium senior secondary school, affiliated, on provisional basis since 1984, to the Central Board of Secondary Education (CBSE). It is governed by the HAL Education Society.

About 
HAL School Korwa was founded in 1984 and opened in 1987. It is governed by HAL Education Society. It has classes from Nursery to Class XII. The school has three playgrounds, one ground is also used as assembly ground. It also has five labs for mathematics, chemistry, physics, biology and computer science. The school also has a library. The school has classes for advanced students, and staff rooms for teachers.

Events 
Many events takes place throughout the year in this school. In January, the school celebrates the Republic Day of India. In August, Independence Day is celebrated in the school assembly ground. In November/December, a science/maths/arts/crafts fair takes place in the school. In December, the annual sports day is organised in which inter-house as well as inter-school events takes place.

References

External links 
Government Website

1984 establishments in Uttar Pradesh
Amethi district
Educational institutions established in 1984
High schools and secondary schools in Uttar Pradesh
Universities and colleges in Amethi district